The Chihuahuan Desert is a desert ecoregion designation covering parts of northern Mexico and the southwestern United States. It occupies much of far West Texas, the middle to lower Rio Grande Valley and the lower Pecos Valley in New Mexico, and a portion of southeastern Arizona, as well as the central and northern portions of the Mexican Plateau. It is bordered on the west by the Sonoran Desert, the Colorado Plateau, and the extensive Sierra Madre Occidental range, along with northwestern lowlands of the Sierra Madre Oriental range. Its largest, continual expanse is located in Mexico, covering a large portion of the state of Chihuahua, along with portions of Coahuila, north-eastern Durango, the extreme northern part of Zacatecas, and small western portions of Nuevo León. The desert is fairly young, existing for only 8000 years.

Geography

There are several larger mountain ranges in the Chihuahan Desert, including the Sierra Madre, the Sierra del Carmen, the Organ Mountains, the Franklin Mountains, the Sacramento Mountains, the Chisos Mountains, the Guadalupe Mountains, and the Davis Mountains. These create "sky islands" of cooler, wetter, climates adjacent to, or within the desert, and such elevated areas have both coniferous and broadleaf woodlands, including forests along drainages and favored exposures. The lower elevations of the Sandia–Manzano Mountains, the Magdalena–San Mateo Mountains, and the Gila Region partly border the Chihuahuan Desert and partly border other ecoregions that are not deserts.

There are few urban areas within the desert: the largest is Ciudad Juárez with almost two million inhabitants; Chihuahua, Saltillo, and Torreón; and the US cities of El Paso and Albuquerque. Alamogordo, Alpine, Benson, Carlsbad, Carrizozo, Deming, Fort Stockton, Fort Sumner, Las Cruces, Marfa, Pecos, Roswell, and Willcox are among the other communities in this ecoregion. Safford and Benson in Arizona are located in low elevations of the western edges of the Chihuahuan Desert, but in an ecotone with the Sonoran Desert.

According to the World Wide Fund for Nature the Chihuahuan Desert may be the most biologically diverse desert in the world as measured by species richness or endemism. The region has been badly degraded, mainly due to grazing. Many native grasses and other species have become dominated by woody native plants, including creosote bush and mesquite, due to overgrazing and other urbanization. The Mexican wolf, once abundant, was nearly extinct and remains on the endangered species list.

Climate
The desert is mainly a rain shadow desert because the two main mountain ranges which bound the desert, the Sierra Madre Occidental to the west and the Sierra Madre Oriental to the east, block most moisture from the Pacific Ocean and the Gulf of Mexico, respectively. The majority of rain falls between late June and early October during the North American Monsoon when moist air from the Gulf of Mexico and the Sea of Cortez penetrates into the region, or much less frequently, when a tropical cyclone moves inland and stalls. 

The hottest temperatures in the desert occur in lower elevation areas and valleys, including near the Rio Grande from south of El Paso into the Big Bend, and the Bolson de Mapimi. A subtropical temperature regime describes lower elevations in the Texas Big Bend region up to the Presidio and Candelaria areas, then southward into similar elevations, while a warm temperate temperature regime describes higher elevations and further north.

Snowfall is scant except at the higher elevation edges. Northern and eastern portions have more definite winters than southern and western portions, receiving a portion of winter precipitation as snowfall most winters.

Flora

The creosote bush (Larrea tridentata) is the dominant plant species on gravelly and occasional sandy soils in valley areas within the Chihuahuan Desert. The other species found with creosote bush depend on factors including the soil type, elevation, and degree of slope. Viscid acacia (Vachellia vernicosa), and tarbush (Flourensia cernua) dominate northern portions, while broom dalea  (Psorothamnus scoparius) occurs on sandy soils in western portions. Yucca and Opuntia species are abundant on slopes and uplands in most areas, while Arizona rainbow cactus (Echinocereus polyacanthus) and Mexican fire-barrel cactus (Ferocactus pilosus) inhabit portions near the US–Mexico border.

Herbaceous plants, such as bush muhly (Muhlenbergia porteri), blue grama (Bouteloua gracilis), gypsum grama (B. breviseta),  and hairy grama (B. hirsuta), are dominant in desert grasslands and near the mountain edges including the Sierra Madre Occidental. Lechuguilla (Agave lechuguilla), honey mesquite (Prosopis glandulosa), Opuntia macrocentra and Echinocereus pectinatus are the dominant species in western Coahuila. Ocotillo (Fouquieria splendens), lechuguilla, and Yucca filifera are the most common species in the southeastern part of the desert. Candelilla (Euphorbia antisyphilitica), Mimosa zygophylla, Acacia glandulifera and lechuguilla are found in areas with well-draining, shallow soils. The shrubs found near the Sierra Madre Oriental are exclusively lechuguilla, guapilla (Hechtia glomerata), Queen Victoria's agave (Agave victoriae-reginae), sotol (Dasylirion spp.), and barreta (Helietta parvifolia), while the well-developed herbaceous layer includes grasses, legumes, and cacti.

Desert or arid grasslands comprise 20% of this desert and are often mosaics of shrubs and grasses. They include purple three-awn (Aristida purpurea), black grama (Bouteloua eriopoda), and sideoats grama (Bouteloua curtipendula). Early Spanish explorers reported encountering grasses that were "belly high to a horse"; most likely these were big alkali sacaton (Sporobolus wrightii) and tobosa (Pleuraphis mutica) along floodplain or bottomland areas.

The United Nations Environment Programme reported in 2006 that nearly half of the bird, mammal, and butterfly species in the Chihuahuan Desert are expected to be replaced by other species by 2055 due to climate change.

Protected areas
A 2017 assessment found that , or 7%, of the ecoregion is in protected areas. Protected areas include Buenos Aires National Wildlife Refuge in Arizona; Janos Biosphere Reserve, Médanos de Samalayuca Natural Protected Area and Cañón de Santa Elena Flora and Fauna Protection Area in Chihuahua; Cuatro Ciénegas Basin, Ocampo Flora and Fauna Protection Area, and part of Maderas del Carmen Biosphere Reserve in Coahuila; Mapimí Biosphere Reserve and Cañón de Fernández State Park in Durango; Bitter Lake National Wildlife Refuge, Bosque del Apache National Wildlife Refuge, Carlsbad Caverns National Park, Carrizozo Malpais, Oliver Lee Memorial State Park, Organ Mountains–Desert Peaks National Monument, Petroglyph National Monument, Sevilleta National Wildlife Refuge, and White Sands National Park in New Mexico; and Big Bend National Park, Big Bend Ranch State Park, Black Gap Wildlife Management Area, Franklin Mountains State Park, and part of Guadalupe Mountains National Park in Texas.

Gallery

See also 

List of deserts by area
List of ecoregions in the United States (WWF)
List of geographical regions in Texas
McKittrick Canyon
Malpai Borderlands
Pecos River
Samalayuca Dune Fields
Sky islands
Solitario formation
Sonoran Desert
Trans-Pecos
West Texas

References

External links

Chihuahuan Desert images at bioimages.vanderbilt.edu (slow modem version)
Pronatura Noreste in the Chihuahuan Desert
Small desert beetle found to engineer ecosystems EurekAlert! March 27, 2008

 
Deserts and xeric shrublands in the United States
Ecoregions of the United States
Deserts and xeric shrublands
Ecoregions of Mexico
Deserts of Mexico
Deserts of New Mexico
Deserts of Texas
Deserts of Arizona
Mexican Plateau
Southwestern United States
Natural history of Chihuahua (state)
Natural history of Coahuila
Natural history of Durango
Natural history of Nuevo León
Natural history of Zacatecas
Natural history of the Mexican Plateau
Deserts of North America
Geography of Chihuahua (state)
Geography of Coahuila
Geography of Durango
Geography of Nuevo León
Geography of Zacatecas
Madrean Region